Evgeny Yuryevich Plakhutin (born 20 August 1994) is a Russian karateka. He won a bronze medal at the 2019 European Games and was the European champion in 2019.WKF Ranking. World Karate Federation.

Achievements

References

1994 births
Living people
Russian male karateka
European Games bronze medalists for Russia
Karateka at the 2015 European Games
Karateka at the 2019 European Games
European Games medalists in karate
Place of birth missing (living people)
21st-century Russian people